Slowly Wait is the first EP by William Wei. It was released on 13 March 2009, by Linfair Records. The EP consists of two tracks, 'Slowly Wait' (慢慢等) and 'Good Weather' (好天氣). Both songs were previously published onto StreetVoice, an online music platform, and stayed on top of the charts for weeks. The song, 'Slowly Wait', continued to chart inside the top three positions for two consecutive years.

Track listing

References

2009 EPs
William Wei albums